Qajar Barani (also Romanized as Qajar Bārānī; also known as Gholāmḩoseyn-e Bārānī) is a village in Jahanabad Rural District, in the Central District of Hirmand County, Sistan and Baluchestan Province, Iran. At the 2006 census, its population was 82, in 22 families.

References 

Populated places in Hirmand County